The 12357 / 12358 Durgiana Express is a Superfast train of the Indian Railways connecting  in West Bengal and  of Punjab. It is currently being operated with 12357/12358 train numbers on a twice a week basis.

Service

The 12357/Durgiana Express has an average speed of 62 km/hr and covers 1818 km in 29 hrs 10 mins. 12358/Durgiana Express has an average speed of 61 km/hr and covers 1818 km in 29 hrs 40 mins. Earlier it used to run nonstop between Lucknow NR and Moradabad JN, but then got the halt at Bareilly JN. Maximum permissible speed till DDU is 130 kmph, from DDU to LKO it is 110 kmph, from LKO to MB it is 100 kmph, from MB to UMB it is 110 kmph, from UMB to LDH it is 130 kmph again, and from LDH to ASR it is 110 kmph, and vice versa. 
 
Durgiana express were comes in rail budget as Kolkata Amritsar doronto but afterwards it is named as Durgiana Express but the time table remains same . In few station like Varanasi Jn., Pandit Deen Dayal Upadhya Jn. it is still announced as Kolkata Amritsar Doronto Express.

It is the fastest train in superfast category on grand chord line(4th fastest train between Ddu to KOAA after Howrah Rajdhani,  Sealdah Rajdhani and Sealdah doronto). It get high priority on its route.

Durgiana express route permanently diverted in Varanasi Lucknow section. Earlier it reach Lucknow fron Varanasi via Sultanpur but now it reach Lucknow via Pratapgarh,  and vice -versa.

Route & Halts 

The important halts of the train are:

Coach composition

The train has standard LHB rakes with max speed of 130 kmph. The train consists of 22 coaches:

 2 AC II Tier
 6 AC III Tier
 9 sleeper coaches
 3 general
 2 EOGs

Traction

Both trains are hauled by a Howrah(HWH)-based WAP-7 electric locomotive from Kolkata to Amritsar and vice versa.

Rake sharing 

This train shares its rake with:
 12319/12320 Kolkata–Agra Cantonment Superfast Express
 13135/13136 Kolkata–Jaynagar Weekly Express

See also 

 Kolkata railway station
 Amritsar Junction railway station
 Kolkata–Agra Cantonment Superfast Express
 Kolkata–Jaynagar Weekly Express
 Howrah–Amritsar Express

Notes

External links 

 12357/Durgiana Express
 12358/Durgiana SF Express

References 

Transport in Kolkata
Transport in Amritsar
Express trains in India
Rail transport in West Bengal
Rail transport in Jharkhand
Rail transport in Bihar
Rail transport in Uttar Pradesh
Rail transport in Haryana
Rail transport in Punjab, India
Railway services introduced in 2010
Named passenger trains of India